The 23rd Annual  South African Music Awards was held on May 27, 2017,
at Sun City Resort and were hosted  by Tumi Morake and Somizi Mhlongo. The nominees were announced on  April 20, 2017. Nasty C lead the nominations with 6, followed by Kwesta 5.

Performers

Winners and nominees
Below is the list of nominees and winners for the popular music categories. Winner's 
are highlighted in bold.

Special Awards
 International Achievement Award – Black Coffee

Lifetime Achievement Award (Brought to you by Telkom)
 Nana Coyote (posthumous award)
 Bhekumuzi Luthuli (posthumous award)
 Roger Lucey

Best Selling Album and Music Downloads of the Year 
 Nathi Buyelekhaya

Best Selling DVD  
 Joyous Celebration (Volume 19: Back to the Cross)

Best Selling Overall Music Download 
 Sfiso Ncwane (Bayede Baba)

Best Selling Music Download (Ring-back Tone) 
 Sfiso Ncwane (Bayede Baba)

Best Selling Full-track Music Download 
 Thabani makhanya

Sampra Award
Highest Radio Airplay of the Year – DBN Nyts "Shumaya"

Record of the year
 AKA - One Time
 Amanda Black - Amazulu
 Babes Wodumo - Wololo ft Mampintsha
 Black Coffee - Your Eyes ft Shekhinah
 DJ Clock - Wolves feat Prom Knights
 Kwesta - Ngud' feat Cassper Nyovest
 Locnville - Cold Shoulder (Official)
 Matthew Mole - Run (Official Video)
 Miss Pru - Ameni Ft Emtee, Fifi Cooper, A-Reece, Sjava, B3nchMarQ & Saudi
 Nasty C - Hell Naw (Official Video)

References

2016 in South Africa
South African Music Awards
2016 music awards